Berno Kjeldsen is a Danish diplomat. He has served as Danish Ambassador to Slovakia (2001–2005) and as Danish Ambassador to Croatia (2005–present). He was Deputy Permanent Representative to NATO 1984–1988. He served in the Danish Armed Forces 1964–1966, received an M.A. Political Science from Copenhagen University and attended the College of Europe in Bruges, Belgium 1969–1970 (William II of Orange promotion). He joined the Danish foreign service in 1972.

References

College of Europe alumni
Ambassadors of Denmark to Slovakia
Ambassadors of Denmark to Croatia
University of Copenhagen alumni
Living people
Year of birth missing (living people)